Terence Fitzroy Connor (born 9 November 1962) is an English former professional football player turned coach who is assistant manager at Blackpool.

He was born in Leeds and was a pupil at Foxwood School, Seacroft, Leeds. As a player, Connor scored 91 goals from 358 games in the Football League as a striker playing for Leeds United, Brighton & Hove Albion, Portsmouth, Swansea City and Bristol City. He was capped once for the England under-21 team.

He moved into coaching following his playing retirement, briefly working as a coach at both Bristol Rovers and Bristol City before joining Wolves in 1999. After holding a variety of positions he served as Wolves' manager for thirteen games during their Premier League relegation in 2012.

Playing career
Connor scored on his senior debut for Leeds United aged 17, in a 1–0 win over West Bromwich Albion on 17 November 1979. He made 108 appearances in total for Leeds over four seasons, scoring 22 goals. He joined Brighton & Hove Albion in exchange for Andy Ritchie, in March 1983. However, he was unable to appear in their FA Cup Final appearance just months later as he was already cup-tied. The club ended the season relegated. The majority of Connor's games for Brighton came in the Second Division. His form here won him an England under-21 cap in November 1986, when he played and scored against Yugoslavia under-21. He scored 51 goals in 156 appearances before leaving Brighton as they dropped into the third tier in 1987. One of his most memorable goals for Brighton came when they knocked Liverpool out of the 1983-84 FA Cup, a season in which Liverpool won the Football League Cup, European Cup and were crowned English champions. He moved along the South Coast to sign for Portsmouth in a £200,000 deal.

Portsmouth were newly promoted to the First Division at the time of Connor's arrival, but despite his goals they were relegated after just one season. He remained at Fratton Park for three seasons before joining Swansea City for £150,000 in August 1990. After a solitary full season with the Swans in the third tier, he moved to Bristol City in September 1991. He failed to make much impact at Bristol City, playing just 16 times and scoring once; he was also briefly loaned back to Swansea in autumn 1992. He dropped into non-League football in summer 1993 when he signed for Conference club Yeovil Town.

Coaching career

Early roles
After retiring, he became one of the coaching staff at Swindon Town. Later, Connor and family friend Maurice Gardner turned to coaching, working under John Ward at Bristol Rovers, before moving across the city to work at Bristol City.

Move to Wolves
After John Ward moved to become assistant manager at Wolverhampton Wanderers, he recruited Connor to their coaching staff in August 1999.

Connor served as a coach – at youth, reserve and first team level – under a succession of Wolves' managers before being promoted to assistant manager under Mick McCarthy in August 2008.

Promotion to Manager
In February 2012, he was given the role of manager by Wolves until the end of the current season, after the sacking of Mick McCarthy. chief executive Jez Moxey confirmed that the position was offered to one other candidate, widely considered by the media to be Alan Curbishley, who refused the position before Connor was appointed. This was despite Moxey previously stating that the job would be given to an experienced manager.

Connor took charge with Wolves in 18th place, one of five teams at the foot of the table looking to avoid the three relegation places. His first game in charge brought a 2–2 draw at Newcastle United on 25 February 2012. However, his side then suffered seven consecutive defeats which left them rooted to the bottom of the table and were relegated on 22 April after a 0–2 defeat to Manchester City. In his thirteen games, he failed to achieve any wins and gained only four points from a possible 39. The team finished bottom of the table with one of the lowest points tallies in their history (25).

In May 2012 Wolves announced that Connor would be succeeded by Ståle Solbakken as a permanent appointment during the summer. Connor had also been interviewed for the position. It was agreed that he would return to his position as assistant manager following Solbakken's appointment, but he departed after just four games of the new season.

Ipswich Town
On 1 November 2012, Connor renewed his working relationship with Mick McCarthy, as he was appointed Ipswich Town's new assistant manager after McCarthy took charge at the club. On 2 February 2013, Connor took charge of Ipswich while McCarthy was ill and won 4–0 against Middlesbrough.

On 30 June 2014 Mick McCarthy and Terry Connor agreed a new three-year deal with Ipswich. On 10 April 2018 they left Ipswich Town and cut the contract short with a 1–0 win over Barnsley.

Republic of Ireland
On 25 November 2018, the FAI announced that Terry Connor would be the assistant coach of the Republic of Ireland for their upcoming European Championships 2020 campaign, joining Mick McCarthy.

After Ireland

After his role with the Republic of Ireland, he followed McCarthy back into club football and worked on the coaching staff at APOEL, Cardiff City and then Blackpool.

Managerial statistics

References
Player Profile at Leeds-fans.org.uk

1962 births
Living people
People from Seacroft
English footballers
Black British sportspeople
Footballers from Leeds
Association football forwards
England under-21 international footballers
Football managers from Leeds
Leeds United F.C. players
Brighton & Hove Albion F.C. players
Portsmouth F.C. players
Swansea City A.F.C. players
Bristol City F.C. players
Yeovil Town F.C. players
English Football League players
National League (English football) players
English football managers
Premier League managers
Wolverhampton Wanderers F.C. managers
Wolverhampton Wanderers F.C. non-playing staff
Ipswich Town F.C. non-playing staff
Bristol Rovers F.C. non-playing staff
Cardiff City F.C. non-playing staff
Blackpool F.C. non-playing staff